Oberaudorf is a municipality in the district of Rosenheim in Bavaria, Germany. It lies on the river Inn.

Oberaudorf is the birthplace of the mother of German Pope Benedict XVI, of German politician Edmund Stoiber and footballer Bastian Schweinsteiger, who grew up there.

Notable people 
 Edmund Stoiber (born 1941), German politician
 Bastian Schweinsteiger (born 1984), German football player and 2014 World Cup winner

See also
Reisach Priory

References

Rosenheim (district)
Populated places on the Inn (river)